Albert Frederik Hendrik Buining (25 August 1901 in Groningen – 9 May 1976) was a Dutch botanist.

References

1901 births
1976 deaths
20th-century Dutch botanists
Scientists from Groningen (city)